Oligella ureolytica is a Gram-negative, aerobic, motile bacterium with peritrichous flagella of the genus Oligella, isolated from a cervical lymph node and human urine.

References

External links
Type strain of Oligella ureolytica at BacDive -  the Bacterial Diversity Metadatabase

Burkholderiales
Bacteria described in 1987